Corcogemore at , is the 208th–highest peak in Ireland on the Arderin scale, and the 253rd–highest peak on the Vandeleur-Lynam scale.  Corcogemore is located on a small massif that includes Binn Mhór, and Mullach Glas; this massif is situated at the far southeastern sector of the long north-west to south-east central spine of the Maumturks mountain range in the Connemara National Park in Galway, Ireland. Corcogemore is the 8th-highest peak in the Maumturks range, and the most southerly in the range; after Lackavrea, Corcogemore is the 2nd-most easterly Maumturk.

Naming

 is the Irish name for a "beehive", although it can also mean cone (the shape of a traditional beehive).

Cartographer Tim Robinson noted that "the Ordnance Survey has been incorrectly calling this mountain 'Leckavrea' for a hundred and fifty years", with Leckavrea being a mountain to the east of Corcogemore.

Geography

Corcogemore  lies on a small massif in the southeast sector of the Maumturks range, which is separated from the main range by a deep east-west mountain pass called Máméan, a site of pilgrimage dedicated to Saint Patrick since the 5th-century.

To the west, along a high winding ridge across this massif is Mullach Glas , and then Binn Mhór .

Hill walking

The most straightforward route to the summit Corcogemore is the 5-kilometre 2-3 hour roundtrip route from the R336 road, just after Maam Cross, and back; however, because of its positioning on a high ridge of its own small massif, it can also be climbed as an alternative 10-kilometre 4–5 hour route from Corcogemore in the west, across Mullach Glas, to the summit of Binn Mhór, and then finishing down at Máméan (i.e. the route requires two cars).

Corcogemore is also climbed as part of the Maamturks Challenge, a 25-kilometre 10–12 hour walk over the full Maumturks range (from Maam Cross to Leenaun), which is considered one of the "great classic ridge-walks of Ireland", but of "extreme grade" due to the circa 7,600 feet of total ascent.  Since 1975, the University College Galway Mountaineering Club has run the annual "Maamturks Challenge Walk" (MCW), and mans a checkpoint on Corcogemore, which is the first major checkpoint on the Maumturks range.

Bibliography

See also

Twelve Bens, major range in Connemara
Mweelrea, major range in Killary Harbour
Lists of mountains in Ireland
Lists of mountains and hills in the British Isles
List of Marilyns in the British Isles
List of Hewitt mountains in England, Wales and Ireland

References

External links
The Maamturks Challenge, University College Galway Mountaineering Club
The Maamturks Challenge: Routecard (2015)
MountainViews: The Irish Mountain Website, Corcogemore (Corcóg)
MountainViews: Irish Online Mountain Database
The Database of British and Irish Hills , the largest database of British Isles mountains ("DoBIH")
Hill Bagging UK & Ireland, the searchable interface for the DoBIH

Marilyns of Ireland
Hewitts of Ireland
Mountains and hills of County Galway
Mountains under 1000 metres